Shadow Slasher may refer to:

A Japan domestic-market model of Honda Shadow VT750DC motorcycle
A character in the Marvel comics series Master of Kung Fu
An episode of Garo: The Animation